Nick Stringer (born 10 August 1948 in Torquay, Devon) is an English actor.

In a forty-year career, Stringer has appeared in numerous well-known British television shows, including The Bill,  Bergerac , Open All Hours, Only Fools and Horses, Auf Wiedersehen, Pet, Coronation Street, Family Affairs, Minder, Johnny Jarvis, Butterflies, My Family and The Professionals. He also had roles in the films The Long Good Friday (1980), Clockwise (1986) and Personal Services (1987). He appeared in the British police drama, The Sweeney, episode 'One of Your Own', as gang boss 'Patsy Kearney'.

In The Bill he played PC Ron Smollett from 1990 to 1993 who was a likeable, hard-working, and honest cop.

Stringer appeared in the first two series of The New Statesman as the fictional Member of Parliament Bob Crippen, a Labour opponent of the Conservative Alan B'Stard.

Other roles have included a cameo role in Goodnight Sweetheart in the episode "You're Driving Me Crazy" as an undercover detective, and as a deputy headmaster Mr Sullivan in Press Gang (mainly appearing in the first two seasons). He appeared in the BBC drama Holby City, in an episode entitled "Doctor's Dilemma", on 18 June 2008.

Stringer has also made two guest appearances in the BBC sitcom Only Fools and Horses, in the episodes Go West Young Man, he plays an Australian and in Who Wants to be a Millionaire, he plays Del's old business partner, Jumbo Mills, who developed an Australian accent. He is also noted for his strong performance alongside Trevor Byfield in the Minder episode 'The Old School Tie' from Series 2 in 1980 in which they play heavies in what is often claimed to be the most violent episode of the entire ten series.

Nick also appeared in Super Gran as super villain Mad Mick Merseyside. (1985)

Stringer lives in Bristol, England, and is married with two children. In 2018, Stringer recorded a two-part interview for The Bill Podcast

Filmography

Film

Television

External links

1948 births
Living people
Actors from Torquay
English male television actors
Male actors from Devon